Triad Peak is a mountain located on the border of Alberta and British Columbia, Canada. It lies very close to the continental divide at the head of the Athabasca River valley near Jasper National Park. Major headwaters are the Athabasca and Columbia rivers.

A "triad" is a group of three. The mountain was first ascended in 1936 by E. Cromwell, E. Cromwell jr., F.S. North, J. Monroe (Thorington Journal reference AAJ 3-61). It was named in 1936.

See also
 List of peaks on the British Columbia–Alberta border

References

Triad Peak
Triad Peak
Canadian Rockies